Swing, Cowboy, Swing is a 1946 American musical Western film directed by Elmer Clifton and starring Cal Shrum, Max Terhune and Alta Lee. It was shot at the Corriganville Movie Ranch in California. In 1949 it was reissued under the alternative title of Bad Man from Big Bend.

Cast
 Cal Shrum as Cal, Rhythm Rangers Band Leader
 Max Terhune as 'Alibi' Terhune
 Alta Lee as Alta, Cal Shrum Band Singer
 Walt Shrum as Walt, Colorado Hillbillies Band Leader
 Don Weston as Guitar Player
 I. Stanford Jolley as James Beeton
 Ann Roberts as Mary Beeton
 Frank Ellis as Frank Lawson
 Ed Cassidy as Sheriff 
 Ted Adams as Henchman
 Phil Dunham as Fargo Agent
 Tom Hubbard as Tom
 Robert Hoag as Musician 'Pappy'
 Rusty Cline as Musician 'Rusty'
 Jeannie Akers as Singer
 Judy Barnes as Miss Jolley
 Chuck Peters as Musician
 Bob Woodward as Henchman 
 Ace Dehne as Musician 
 Al Winters as Musician

References

Bibliography
 Pitts, Michael R. Western Movies: A Guide to 5,105 Feature Films. McFarland, 2012.

External links
 

1946 films
1946 Western (genre) films
1940s English-language films
American Western (genre) films
Films directed by Elmer Clifton
Astor Pictures films
1940s American films